Marcora is an Italian surname. Notable people with the surname include:

Attilio Marcora (1899–1979), Italian footballer
Carlos Marcora (born 1976), Uruguayan footballer
Giovanni Marcora (1922–1983), Italian businessman and politician
Roberto Marcora (born 1989), Italian tennis player

Italian-language surnames